Tursko may refer to places:

Czech Republic
Tursko (Prague-West District), Central Bohemian Region

Poland
Tursko, Greater Poland Voivodeship, west-central Poland
Tursko, Pomeranian Voivodeship, north Poland
Tursko, Lesser Poland Voivodeship, south Poland